Ted Marshall was a British art director. He was nominated for two Academy Awards in the category Best Art Direction.

Selected filmography
 The Abominable Snowman (1957)
 Tom Jones (1963)
 The Pumpkin Eater (1964)
 Life at the Top (1965)
 The Spy Who Came in from the Cold (1965)
 The Charge of the Light Brigade (1968)

References

External links

British art directors
Year of birth missing
Year of death missing